ZK-93426 (ethyl-5-isopropoxy-4-methyl-beta-carboline-3-carboxylate) is a drug from the beta-carboline family. It acts as a weak partial inverse agonist of benzodiazepine receptors, meaning that it causes the opposite effects to the benzodiazepine class of drugs and has anxiogenic properties, although unlike most benzodiazepine antagonists it is not a convulsant and actually has weak anticonvulsant effects. In human tests it produced alertness, restlessness and feelings of apprehension, and reversed the effect of the benzodiazepine lormetazepam. It was also shown to produce nootropic effects and increased release of acetylcholine.

See also
 ZK-93423

References

Anxiogenics
Beta-Carbolines
GABAA receptor negative allosteric modulators
Nootropics
Phenol ethers
Carboxylate esters
Ethyl esters
Isopropyl compounds